The following lists events that happened during 1978 in the Union of Soviet Socialist Republics.

Incumbents
 General Secretary of the Communist Party of the Soviet Union: Leonid Brezhnev
 Premier of the Soviet Union: Alexei Kosygin
 Chairman of the Russian SFSR: Mikhail Solomentsev

Events

January

February

March

April

May

June

July

September

October

November

December

See also
1978 in fine arts of the Soviet Union
List of Soviet films of 1978

 
1970s in the Soviet Union
Soviet Union
Soviet Union
Soviet Union